Psytechnics is a telecommunications company, spun out of British Telecom's research labs in December 2000. The company's technology is behind 7 ITU standards, including PESQ ITU-T P.862. They developed real-time Quality of Experience monitoring software for calls made with Voice over IP, video, telepresence, and unified communications networks.

Psytechnics was acquired by NetScout Systems on April 1, 2011.

Networking software companies
Privately held companies of the United Kingdom
Companies established in 2000